Marcin Chabowski (born 28 June 1986) is a Polish long-distance runner. He finished fourth in the half marathon at the 2016 European Championships. He led for a large part of the marathon race at the 2014 European Championships but was caught by the chasers and eventually dropped out.

International competitions

Personal bests
Outdoor
1500 metres – 3:44.06 (Warsaw 2009)
3000 metres – 8:01.87 (Sopot 2009)
5000 metres – 13:52.61 (Bydgoszcz 2009)
10,000 metres – 28:27.59 (Kędzierzyn-Koźle 2009)
Half marathon – 1:02:26 (Piła 2011)
Marathon – 2:10:07 (Düsseldorf 2012)
3000 metres steeplechase – 8:25.90 (Szczecin 2008)

Indoor
3000 metres – 8:13.82 (Spała 2004)

References

1986 births
Living people
People from Wejherowo
Polish male long-distance runners
Polish male marathon runners
Polish male steeplechase runners
Athletes (track and field) at the 2020 Summer Olympics
Olympic athletes of Poland